Lerikos is a traditional Greek circle dance. Participants hold hands at the shoulder level and dance in a counterclockwise direction.

See also
Greek music 
Greek dances
Sousta
Greek folk music
Pentozali 
Syrtos
List of folk dances sorted by origin

External links
Google video of lerikos
Dance instructions
Alternative visual instructions

Greek dances
Circle dances